Dimitrija Čupovski (November 8, 1878 – October 29, 1940) was a Macedonian textbook writer and lexicographer. He is considered one of the most prominent ethnic Macedonians in history and one of the most important actors of the start of Macedonian nationalism.

Biography
Dimitrija Čupovski was born in the village of Papradište in the Ottoman Empire (now part of Čaška Municipality, North Macedonia). Before Čupovski was born, his father had been killed by Albanian mercenaries. When he was 10 years old his village was burned, and he and his family settled in Kruševo, his mother's birthplace. After learning the painting trade, he and his brothers left for Sofia in search of work. Čupovski worked there during the day and visited the school organized by Dame Gruev, Petar Pop Arsov, and other students.

However, after that he continued his education in Belgrade at the teacher's school of the St. Sava Society from 1893 to 1894. After completing his education in Belgrade, Cupovski worked as a Serbian teacher in Papradište in 1895-1896. He then returned to Belgrade. Afterwards he continued to study in Saint Petersburg. The Bulgarian Macedonian revolutionary Hristo Shaldev, who lived then in St. Petersburg, described him as a person sharing pro-Serbian views. According to Shaldev, a member of the Secret Macedonian-Adrianopolitan circle and IMRO, the main ideologists under whose influence Čupovski had fallen, were the Serbian professors Stojan Novaković, Jovan Cvijić and Aleksandar Belić. Especially Novaković used his diplomatic role in St. Petersburg to put his ideas into practice, through his support to the Macedonian Literary Society, established in Saint Petersburg in 1902, and its "Macedonist" members as Čupovski.

When in 1905 Čupovski tried to organize for the first time a pan-Macedonian conference in Veles, he was expelled from the town by a local chief of IMRO Ivan Naumov, and was threatened with death for his pro-Macedonian and anti-Bulgarian ideas. Macedonian researcher Blaže Ristovski claims that it happened because of the intrigues of the local Bulgarian Metropolitan bishop and the activity of Shaldev, who then described Čupovski as a Serbian agent, but eventually, in his memoirs, would present a letter from Čupovski, written in 1904, in which he speaks against “the Serbian propaganda in Macedonia and its destructive influence amongst the people”. Some Bulgarian researchers also suppose that Čupovski was a marginal figure and Serbian agent on a service of the Russian Imperial Ministry of Foreign Affairs.

After the outbreak of the Balkan War in 1912, Čupovski arrived on November 17 in Sofia, where he met with a part of the Macedonian emigration, but without much success. On December 4, he arrived in Skopje where Čupovski stayed at his uncle's home and met with some local citizens. This attempt to persuade them to adopt his pro-Macedonian ideas failed too, and he was even expelled by his relative.

Then he went to Veles, where he organized a pan-Macedonian conference, that was de facto a meeting attended by some local revolutionaries from the left-wing of the IMRO. Čupovski convinced them to send representatives to the London peace conference to try to preserve the integrity of the region of Macedonia, but this attempt was also unsuccessful. Afterwards Čupovski left Macedonia and returned to Petersburg, where he initiated the sending of a memorandum to the independence of Macedonia to the Great Powers and another to the countries of the Balkan League. After the Balkan Wars and the Serbian annexation of Vardar Macedonia Čupovski also exposed every detail of the Serbian chauvinistic propaganda, and every victim of the Serbian aggression.

He was one of the founders of the Macedonian Literary Society, established in Saint Petersburg in 1902, and served as its president from 1902 to 1917. Čupovski was also the author of a large number of articles and official documents, publisher of the printed bulletin of the Macedonian Colony, and organiser of several Macedonian associations. He wrote verse both in Russian and Macedonian. He also produced the first Macedonian-Russian dictionary, worked on a Macedonian grammar and an encyclopaedic monograph on Macedonia and the Macedonians. He also drew up an ethnic and geographical map of Macedonia.

In the period 1913–1914, Čupovski published the newspaper "Македонскi Голосъ" (Macedonian Voice) in which he and fellow members of the Petersburg Macedonian Colony promoted the existence of a separate Macedonian people different from the Greeks, Bulgarians and Serbs, and were struggling to popularize the idea for an independent Macedonian state. After the First World War and the October Revolution in Russia, the political activity of Čupovski ceased.

Čupovski died in Saint Petersburg on October 29, 1940, aged 61. His son inscribed "a fighter for the right and freedom of the Macedonian people" on the cross of his grave.

References

External links

 
 МАКЕДОНСКIЙ ГОЛОСЪ – Број 1 (9 Јуни 1913 година).

1878 births
1940 deaths
Macedonian writers
Macedonian culture
Early Macedonists
Macedonian Scientific and Literary Society
Emigrants from the Ottoman Empire to the Russian Empire